Helichrysum arenarium is also known as dwarf everlast, and as immortelle.

Description
As a perennial plant, it grows to be an average of 0.3 m tall.

The leaves are flat, the lower ones being elliptical in shape, while the upper ones are linear.  They are wooly on both sides.

The flower heads are arranged in loosely, a cross between umbel and panicle.  They are 3 to 4 mm wide  of bright golden yellow florets.

It is found in Eastern France to Sweden as well as on the mountains of Uzbekistan on sandy grasslands, and heathland.
It is also widely spread on the Dalmatian coast in Croatia where locals regularly pick and sell it throughout the summer (local Mediterranean climate permitting even as late as September and October).

Similar species
Helichrysum stoechas  is similar to the Helichrysum arenarium species, but the leaves are all linear, with rolled under edges. It is found in western France on dunes near the sea.

References

arenarium